The Campbell Express is a weekly newspaper in the U.S state of California. Originally published as the Cambrian News, the paper covers community news and opinion pieces serving the Campbell and Cambrian neighborhoods. Based in Campbell, California, the paper is one of only a few newspapers in the San Francisco Bay Area that is adjudicated to publish public legal notices. It is also the longest-running newspaper of the Campbell area.

The purpose of the newspaper is described as helping their remain connected to the community through providing local news coverage and weekly columns written by Campbell residents as primary sources. According to the American Newspapers Representative database, the Campbell Express has a weekly free circulation of 2,500.

The editor of the Campbell Express is Roberta C. Howe.

History   
The Campbell Express was originally published as the Cambrian News in 1931. It was owned by The McClatchy Company with an estimated weekly circulation of 2,700 copies. Steve Provost was the editor of the Cambrian News.

Before 1976, Wilton von Gease bought the Cambrian News. von Grease later wrote a book called Jackass Flats.

Bonny Hanchett owned and published the Express for 15 years.

Sally Howe was a news reporter and then publisher of the Campbell Express. In 2003, she bought the newspaper. In 2012, Sally Howe was recognized by the mayor of Campbell as a "Woman of Distinction." Roberta Howe ran and edited the paper after her mother Sally's death in 2015.

Awards 
Each year the Campbell Chamber of Commerce honors a Campbell business that has provided excellent service to the community. In 2001, the Campbell Express won 'Business of the Year'.

References

External links 
 website

Weekly newspapers published in California
Companies based in Campbell, California
McClatchy publications